Manliness is a set of attributes, behaviors and roles generally associated with boys and men.

Manliness may also refer to:

 Manliness (book), a book by Harvey Mansfield

See also
 Manly (disambiguation)